{{Infobox film
| name           = A Midsummer Night's Dream
| image          =
| caption        =
| director       = Jiří Trnka
| producer       = Erna KmínkováJaroslav Mozis
| screenplay     = 
| based_on       = {{based on|A Midsummer Night's Dream|William Shakespeare}} 
| narrator       = Rudolf Pellar
| cinematography = Jiří Vojta
| editing        = Hana Walachová
| distributor    = Ústřední půjčovna filmů
| released       = 
| runtime        = 76 minutes 
| country        = Czechoslovakia
| language       = Czech
}}A Midsummer Night's Dream is a 1959 Czechoslovak animated puppet film directed by Jiří Trnka, his last feature length film before his death 10 years later in 1969. It is based on the Shakespeare play of the same name.filmlinc.org

Production
Trnka, working under the Czech communist regime who had previously been denied in his wish to adapt Don Quixote, worked for several years on his adaptation of A Midsummer Night's Dream. The film established a new pinnacle of craftmanship.

Beyond the artistic aspects the film was technically advanced. Trnka used expensive Eastmancolor stock* Every scene was shot with two cameras simultaneously—one shooting Academy ratio, and one shooting in the then new CinemaScope format, effectively producing an in-camera pan-and-scan version—all so Trnka could ensure that his widescreen production would not be presented letterboxed. The film thus exists in two definitive editions.

The score was composed by Václav Trojan.

Reception
It also won an Honourable Medal at the 20th Venice International Film Festival in 1959; first prize for best film in Bucharest in 1960; second prize in Montevideo in 1960; and first prize—the "Golden Mercury"—for music in Valencia in 1962. Time magazine included the film in the Top 10 foreign movies of 1961.

Cerise Howard, discussing the film in a retrospective on Trnka for Senses of Cinema'', describes the puppet animation as "more liquid, more balletic than ever"; the scenes between Nick Bottom and Titania are "achingly tender"; Titania's train is "an especially astonishing, luminous creation… constituted of tens of fairies, individually animated amidst reams of gorgeous, extensive coral garlanding". Overall the film is "distinguished by exquisite design throughout".

English-language version
An English-language version was made with narration by Richard Burton and voice work by Alec McCowen.

Voice cast

Hugh Manning as Theseus
Laura Graham as Hippolyta
Jack Gwillim as Oberon
Barbara Jefford as Titania
Roger Shepherd as Puck
Alec McCowen as Nick Bottom
Ann Bell as Hermia
Barbara Leigh-Hunt as Helena
Joss Ackland as Peter Quince
Michael Meacham as Demetrius
Stephen Moore as Francis Flute
Tom Criddle as Lysander

References

Bibliography

Further reading

External links
 

1959 films
1959 animated films
1950s stop-motion animated films
Animated adaptations of William Shakespeare
Czechoslovak animated films
1950s Czech-language films
Czech animated films
Czech fantasy films
Films about fairies and sprites
Films directed by Jiří Trnka
Films based on A Midsummer Night's Dream
Puppet films
Films with screenplays by Jiří Brdečka
Czech animated comedy films
Czech animated romance films